Namami Gange Programme is an Integrated Conservation Mission, approved as a Flagship Programme by the Union Government of India in June 2014 with a budget outlay of Rs.20,000 crore to accomplish the twin objectives of effective abatement of pollution, conservation and rejuvenation of National River Ganga. It aimed at engaging with the UK community which will connect various interest groups including Scientists, Technology companies, Investors and community members. NMCG(National Mission For Clean Ganga) has decided to declare Chacha Chaudhary the popular comic book character, as the mascot of the Namami Gange Programme a statement issued by the Ministry of Jal Shakti. Under the Namami Gange Programme, all the drains falling into the river Saryu in the religious and historical city of Ayodhya are being tapped and contaminated water is being transported to the sewerage treatment plant.

Clean Ganga roadshow, which was inaugurated on the sidelines of COP26 in Glasgow resulted in forming four chapters in Scotland, Wales, Midlands and London to connect various interest groups with the Namami Gange Programme. Over 30,000 seeds of India's major carps which are declining in the entire Ganga River like catla, rohu, and mrigal fishes  were released on the confluence of the Ganga and the Yamuna in Prayagraj Sangam. National Mission for Clean Ganga (NMCG) show that out of 341 projects, 147 (or 43 per cent) are completed in which majority of projects are related to sewage infrastructure and 61 out of 157 sewage projects (39 per cent) have been completed.
During the flag-off of the MV Ganga Vilas cruise, Prime Minister Narendra Modi said, “Ganga ji is not just a river and we are taking a twin approach through Namami Gange and Arth Ganga to serve this holy river.”

References

External links
Namami Gange Programme GS Score. Retrieved 13 December 2022

Conservation and restoration of cultural heritage
Ministry of Water Resources (India)